Bohdan Ben (Богдан Бень) is a Ukrainian political scientist, based in Lviv.

Ben is an author of multiple articles published in Ukrainian English-language newspapers Kyiv Post, and Euromaidan Press.

Research
Bohdan Ben has received a bachelor's degree in political science from National University of Kyiv-Mohyla Academy. He is a researcher in the fields of ethics and social philosophy, as well as local governance.

References

Ukrainian journalists
Ukrainian political scientists
Year of birth missing (living people)
Living people